Cheirothricidae  is a family of extinct bony fish, perhaps belonging to the Aulopiformes. They lived in the Upper Cretaceous (Cenomanian - Santonian, about 95 - 85 million years ago) and their fossil remains were found in the Middle East and Europe. They were characterized by very expanded even fins.

Genera
Cheirotrhrix
Exocoetoides
Telepholis

Description
The main characteristic of these small fish (the length of the body was usually between 3 and 20 centimeters in length) was given by the extreme development of the even fins; in Cheirothrix species the pectoral fins were particularly developed, while in Telepholis and Exocoetoides also the pelvic fins were large. In any case, the fins were large and provided with very long rays.

Cheirothrix was the largest genus, had a more robust body and could reach 20 centimeters in length; Telepholis, usually shorter and with a thinner body, had shorter pectoral fins than Exocoetoides and had some small and thin shields in the dorsal region, rounded or polygonal, adorned in the center with a tubercle. The caudal fin was not very indented. 
 
Exocoetoides, on the other hand, was decidedly small in size (between 3 and 7 centimeters in length) and the pectoral fins were particularly long (they could reach the anal region); in the caudal fin both lobes were the same size.

Taxonomy and fossil record
Established in 1901 by Arthur Smith Woodward, the family Cheirothricidae was widespread in the ancient Tethys Ocean, in the areas currently occupied by the Middle East and Europe.

All three genera are known in the Cretaceous of Lebanon (Cheirothrix in deposits of the Santonian, the other two genera in deposits of the Cenomanian), and in Europe (Exocoetoides in Croatia and the other two in Germany).

Cheirotricides are generally considered to be representatives of the Aulopiformes; in particular, affinities have been proposed with the extinct group of Enchodontidae.

Paleobiology
Cheirothricidae had a morphology remarkably similar to that of the current flying fishes and to that of other extinct forms like Thoracopterus. Like today's Cypselurus and Exocoetus, Cheirothricidae were also likely to perform a sort of gliding flight over water, thanks to the notable expansion of the pectoral and pelvic fins.

Bibliography
 James W. Davis (1887). "The fossil fishes of the chalk of Mount Lebanon in Syria". Royal Dublin Society. 2 (3).
M. Gayet, A. Belouze & P. Abi Saad, 2003. Les Poissons fossiles. Éditions Desiris,. 158 p.

References 

Note: This article has been expanded using material based on a translation of an article from the Italian Wikipedia.

Aulopiformes
Prehistoric ray-finned fish families